Bouanéla is a district in the Likouala Department of Republic of the Congo.

References 

Likouala Department
Districts of the Republic of the Congo